Marco Casto (born 2 June 1972) is a retired Belgian football defender.

References

1972 births
Living people
Belgian footballers
R. Charleroi S.C. players
R.E. Mouscron players
R.A.E.C. Mons players
Union Royale Namur Fosses-La-Ville players
Association football defenders
Belgian Pro League players